Power Rangers Beast Morphers are the twenty-sixth and twenty-seventh seasons of the American television program Power Rangers. The first season premiered on Nickelodeon on March 2, 2019, while the second season premiered on February 22, 2020, and concluded on December 12, 2020.

Beast Morphers was the only television series to be produced by Hasbro's production studio Allspark before it was absorbed into Entertainment One in October 2020, as well as the first in the franchise to have all toys manufactured and distributed by Hasbro. Both seasons were produced using footage, costumes, and props from the thirty-sixth entry in the Japanese long-running tokusatsu drama Super Sentai series, Tokumei Sentai Go-Busters which aired in 2012. As a result. The series also serves as a direct sequel to Power Rangers RPM (2009).

Beast Morphers was originally to be produced by Saban Brands. During pre-production, Hasbro acquired the Power Rangers franchise and other entertainment assets from Saban Brands and the latter company subsequently closed on July 2, 2018.

Plot 
Scientists in the city of Coral Harbor have discovered a way to convert the infinite power of the Morphin Grid into a physical substance called "Morph-X", providing the city with a source of unlimited clean energy. To protect the city, a secret agency known as Grid Battleforce combines Morph-X with animal DNA to create a new team of Power Rangers. Now the Beast Morpher Rangers: Devon Daniels, Ravi Shaw, and Zoey Reeves must defend the Morphin Grid from Evox, an evil sentient computer virus from another dimension and his evil avatar clones of original Ranger candidates Blaze and Roxy, who were rendered comatose. After the three of them are transported to the Cyber Dimension, Evox, Cybervillain Blaze, and Cybervillain Roxy gain its de facto ruler Scrozzle as an ally as he helps them in their plan to return Evox to Earth. 

As the Rangers battle Evox's robot monsters, they gain two new additions to the team: Nate Silva, the head researcher and scientist of Grid Battleforce who becomes the Gold Ranger and Steel, a robot Nate was forced to create as a body for Evox, who gains sentience and becomes the Silver Ranger.

In the second season, Evox possesses Mayor Daniels and plots to finish what he started with the help of Scrozzle, who uses a machine to revive the Blaze and Roxy avatars as robots. Along the way, the Rangers uncover Evox's true origins and receive help from the original, Dino Thunder, and Dino Charge Rangers as well as allies of the Ranger Operators to defeat Evox and his minions once and for all.

Cast and characters

Rangers 
 Rorrie D. Travis as Devon Daniels, the Red Beast Morpher Ranger.
 Jazz Baduwalia as Ravi Shaw, the Blue Beast Morpher Ranger.
 Jacqueline Scislowski as Zoey Reeves, the Yellow Beast Morpher Ranger.
 Abraham Rodriguez as Nathan "Nate" Silva, the Gold Beast Morpher Ranger.
 Jamie Linehan (voice) and Sam Jellie (human) as Steel Silva, the Silver Beast Morpher Ranger.

Supporting characters 
 Kelson Henderson as the voice of Cruise
 Charlie McDermott as the voice of Smash
 Emmett Skilton as the voice of Jax
 Kristina Ho as Betty Burke
 Cosme Flores as Ben Burke
 Kevin Copeland as Adam Daniels
 Teuila Blakely as Commander Shaw
 Sia Trokenheim as Muriel Reeves
 Mark Wright as General Burke
 Colby Strong as Blaze
 Liana Ramirez as Roxy
 Miriama Smith as Regina Collins
 Madeleine Adams as Megan
 Molly Leishman as Kerry Dixon
 Jack Buchanan as Captain Chaku
 Lina Clare as Starlight
 Mel Odedra as Bruce Silva
 Rachel Foreman as Cheryl Silva

Villains 
 Andrew Laing as the voice of Evox/Venjix
 Campbell Cooley as the voice of Scrozzle
 Colby Strong as Cybervillain Blaze and Robo-Blaze
 Liana Ramirez as Cybervillain Roxy and Robo-Roxy
 Jamie Linehan as the voice of Vargoyle
 Kevin Keys as the voice of Ryjack

Guest stars 
 Brennan Mejia as Tyler Navarro, the Dino Charge Red Ranger.
 James Davies as Chase Randall, the Dino Charge Black Ranger.
 Yoshi Sudarso as Koda, the Dino Charge Blue Ranger.
 Davi Santos as Sir Ivan, the Dino Charge Gold Ranger.
 Austin St. John as Jason Lee Scott, the Mighty Morphin Red Ranger.
 Olivia Tennet as Doctor K
 Richard Simpson as the voice of Keeper
 James Gaylyn as Colonel Mason Truman
 Adam Gardiner as the voice of Sledge
 Jackie Clarke as the voice of Poisandra
 Paul Harrop as the voice of Fury
 Estevez Gillespie as the voices of Wrench and Curio
 Adrian Smith as the voice of Goldar Maximus

Episodes 

 Season 26 (2019) 

 Season 27 (2020)

Production 
Saban Brands announced on February 12, 2018, that it had renewed its partnership with Nickelodeon for an additional three years now going until 2021. In a joint statement on February 15, 2018, Saban announced that it would not renew its master toy license with Bandai going forward and that the current license would expire on April 1, 2019, ending a 25-year partnership dating back to 1993 with Mighty Morphin Power Rangers. The following day on February 16, 2018, at New York Toy Fair 2018, Hasbro announced that it had acquired the master toy license from Saban Brands, revealed a re-branded logo for the Power Rangers franchise and mentioned that their contract with Saban Brands included an option to negotiate the purchase of the Power Rangers franchise from Saban Brands at a later time if they chose. The next day on February 17, 2018, at the New York Toy Fair, Hasbro announced that their toys would start to appear in April 2019 and that the Super Sentai series Tokumei Sentai Go-Busters would be the first season adapted under the re-branded Power Rangers logo as Power Rangers Beast Morphers.

On May 1, 2018, Hasbro announced that it had agreed to purchase the Power Rangers franchise from Saban Brands in a cash-and-stock deal valued at $522 million. On May 25, 2018, it was revealed that Saban Brands was preparing to lay off a majority of its employees with Saban Brands ceasing operation on July 2, 2018, though its parent company Saban Capital Group would remain open for business.

Judd "Chip" Lynn, who resumed executive producer duties for Power Rangers since Dino Charge, returned for Beast Morphers.

The first season finished filming on December 20, 2018. The second season began filming about a month later. Filming for the second season finished on May 22, 2019.

Noam Kaniel (Noam) composes the music for the series alongside Youssef "Joe" Guezoum, and Matt McGuire.

See also 
 List of Power Rangers episodes

Notes

References

External links 

 Official Power Rangers website
 
 Hasbro Pulse Power Rangers Lighting Collection

Beast Morphers
2019 American television series debuts
2010s American science fiction television series
2020s American science fiction television series
2010s Nickelodeon original programming
2020s Nickelodeon original programming
American children's action television series
American children's adventure television series
American children's fantasy television series
English-language television shows
Television series about parallel universes
Television series by Hasbro Studios
Cyberpunk television series
Malware in fiction
Television series set in the future
Television shows filmed in New Zealand
Television series created by Haim Saban